Pascal Pinon may refer to:
 Pasqual Piñón (1889–1929), known as The Two-Headed Mexican
 Pascal Pinon (band), an Icelandic band